Anevaines (Greek: Ανέβαινες) is the second studio album by the popular Greek artist Peggy Zina, released in 1998 by BMG Greece.

Track listing 
"M' Ena Pseftiko Sougia" (Μ' ένα ψέυτικο σουγιά; A false pocketknife) - 4:21
"Anevaines" (Ανέβαινες; You rise) - 3:18
"Sinnefiasmeni Kyriaki" (Συνεφιασμένη κυριακή; Cloudy Sunday) - 4:26
"Psihi Mou Moni" (Ψυχή μου μόνη; my Soul alone) - 3:19
"Den Eimai Tipota" (Δεν είμαι τίποτα; I am nothing) - 2:59
"O Kaliteros Tropos" (Ο καλύτερος τρόπος; The better way) - 3:35
"Leme Leme" (Λέμε λέμε; We say we say) - 3:08
"Me Parakoloutheis" (Με παρακολουθείς; You watch me) - 3:44
"Dikeologies" (Δικαιολογίες; Excuses) - 3:18
"Apomonothikes" (Απομονώθηκες; You were isolated) - 3:13
"Μythos" (Μύθος; Fable) - 3:17
"Alkionides Meres" (Αλκυονύδες μέρες; Halcyon days) - 4:27

1998 albums
Greek-language albums
Peggy Zina albums
Sony Music Greece albums